Doakes may refer to:

 Mary Doakes (1936–2019), African-American school teacher
 James Doakes, fictional character from the television and book series Dexter